Przemysław Waściński (born 29 March 1995) is a Polish athlete who specializes in the 400 metres. He won gold in the 4 × 400 m relay at the 2017 European Athletics Indoor Championships.

As of 2017, he is a member of MUKS Kadet Rawicz and is coached by Aldona Świtała.

Achievements

References

1995 births
Living people
Polish male sprinters
People from Rawicz
European Athletics Championships medalists
Sportspeople from Greater Poland Voivodeship
21st-century Polish people